BR-373 is a Brazilian federal highway that begins in Limeira, São Paulo and ends in Barracão, Paraná. The highway also serves the municipalities of Itapetininga and Itapevi in São Paulo; and Ponta Grossa and Guarapuava in Paraná.

References

Federal highways in Brazil